Donovan C. Pines (born March 7, 1998) is an American professional soccer player who plays as a center-back for D.C. United in Major League Soccer and the United States national team. Pines previously played college soccer for the University of Maryland, and for D.C. United's Academy. His father is current University of Maryland president, Darryll Pines.

Early career 
Pines played soccer for River Hill High School before attending University of Maryland College Park. Pines played three years of college soccer for the Terrapins  and was a starter all three years at Maryland where he made 56 appearances, and scored 3 goals. At the end of the 2016 NCAA Division I men's soccer season, he was honored with Big Ten All-Freshman Team recognition. He was named to the All-Big Ten Second Team his sophomore year, before having a breakout season his junior year. Concluding the 2018 NCAA Division I men's soccer season, he was part of the national championship-winning Maryland team. Individually, Pines was named to the All-Big Ten First Team, the Top Drawer Soccer Best XI, as well as the College Cup All-Tournament Team.

Professional 
Concluding the 2018 NCAA soccer season, Pines was linked to several European clubs, but ultimately signed a homegrown contract with D.C. United on January 18, 2019.

Ahead of the 2019 USL Championship season, Pines went on a season-long loan to D.C. United's reserve side, Loudoun United FC. Pines made his professional soccer debut on March 9, 2019, for Loudoun United in a 0–2 loss to Nashville SC. Pines played the entire match.

Pines made his Major League Soccer debut with D.C. United on April 13, 2019, against the Colorado Rapids at Dick's Sporting Goods Park. He played the full 90 minutes and recorded an assist to Luciano Acosta in a 3–2 win over the Rapids. On April 28, 2019, in a game against Minnesota United, Pines scored what would've been his first goal for D.C. United but it was disallowed by VAR due to a foul during the play. In early May, Pines sprained a ligament in his knee after a 3–1 win against the Columbus Crew. He returned from his injury on June 26, 2019.

Pines scored his first MLS goal in a 2–2 draw against the Philadelphia Union on October 14, 2020. He scored his second goal for United just four days later in a 2–1 win over FC Cincinnati.

International
Pines made his senior debut for the United States on July 15, 2021, when he was subbed on in the 79th minute of a 6–1 win over Martinique in the group stage of the 2021 CONCACAF Gold Cup.

Career statistics

International

Honors 
United States
CONCACAF Gold Cup: 2021

Individual
2018 College Cup All-Tournament Team
2018 United Soccer Coaches Second Team All-American
2018 Top Drawer Soccer Best XI First Team
2018 United Soccer Coaches First Team All-Region
2018 All-Big Ten First Team
2017 All-Big Ten Second Team
Top Drawer Soccer National Team of the Week (9/25/17)
2016 Big Ten All-Freshman Team

References

External links 
 

1998 births
Living people
American soccer players
Association football defenders
D.C. United players
Loudoun United FC players
Maryland Terrapins men's soccer players
USL Championship players
People from Howard County, Maryland
Soccer players from Maryland
2021 CONCACAF Gold Cup players
Sportspeople from the Baltimore metropolitan area
United States men's under-23 international soccer players
United States men's international soccer players
Major League Soccer players
Homegrown Players (MLS)
CONCACAF Gold Cup-winning players